Alan Oliver (Lanny) Ebenstein (born May 28, 1959) is an American political scientist, educator and author, known from his biographical works on Friedrich Hayek and Milton Friedman.

Biography 
Born in Princeton, New Jersey, to William Ebenstein (1910-1976), a noted political scientist, and Ruth Ebenstein. He obtained his BA at the University of California, Santa Barbara, in 1982, and his PhD at the London School of Economics in 1988.

After his graduation, Ebenstein was an instructor at Antioch University from 1990 to 1996. In 1992, he was the Republican nominee for the California State Assembly in the 35th District. From 1990 to 1998 he was a member of the Santa Barbara Board of Education. Since 2005, he has been a visitor and lecturer in economic thought and history at the University of California, Santa Barbara.

Ebenstein is well-known in the Santa Barbara community as a supporter of education. He signed seven ballot arguments between 2008 and 2016 on behalf of school bonds and school parcel taxes for the Santa Barbara Unified School District and the Santa Barbara Community College District.

In 1991, Ebenstein co-edited the 5th edition of Great Political Thinkers: Plato to the Present, which was first published in 1951 by his father. Since the 1990s, he has written a series of biographies on economists, starting with Edwin Cannan in 1997, Friedrich Hayek in 2001, and Milton Friedman in 2007. 

In 2015, Ebenstein published the highly acclaimed Chicagonomics: The Evolution of Chicago Free Market Economics. Chicagonomics was named on "Editors' Choice" Selection by the New York Times Book Review (November 29. 2015) and The Economist concluded its review that Chicagonomics "deserves to be read by all those with an interest in economic policy" (October 24, 2015). Ebenstein's works have been translated into Chinese, Japanese, Italian, Spanish, Romanian, Polish, and Vietnamese.

Selected publications 
 Ebenstein, William, and Alan O. Ebenstein (eds.) Great Political Thinkers: Plato to the Present. Fort Worth: Harcourt, 5th ed., 1991.
 Ebenstein, Alan O. The Greatest Happiness Principle: An Examination of Utilitarianism. 1991.
 Ebenstein, Alan O. Collected Works of Edwin Cannan 1998 (7 volumes).
 
 Ebenstein, Alan O. Hayek's Journey: The Mind of Friedrich Hayek. 2003.
 
 Ebenstein, Lanny. Reforming Public Employee Compensation and Pensions. 2010.
 Ebenstein, Lanny.  The Indispensable Milton Friedman: Essays on Politics and Economics.,  Regnery, 2012.`
 Ebenstein, Lanny. Chicagonomics: The Evolution of Chicago Free Market Economics., St. Martin's Press, 2015.

References

External links 

 Lanny Ebenstein, adjunct scholar at cato.org 
 Dr. Alan Ebenstein: The Rise and Triumph of the Free Market at tfas.org
 The Ideas and Impact of F. A. Hayek. featuring Bruce J. Caldwell and Ebenstein, with comments by Dick Armey
 Alan Ebenstein - Friedrich Hayek: A Biography. Alan Ebenstein talked about his book, Friedrich Hayek: A Biography
 Alan O. Ebenstein and Charles W. Baird | Friedrich Hayek and the Future of Liberty
 Lanny Ebenstein: The Indispensable Milton Friedman
 
 

1959 births
Living people
American political scientists
American educators
American non-fiction writers
University of California, Santa Barbara alumni
Academics of the London School of Economics
Antioch University alumni